Mait Klaassen (born 23 January 1955 in Tartu) is an Estonian politician who served the Minister of Education from 17 March 1997, to 25 March 1999.

Career
Klaassen was the rector of the Estonian University of Life Sciences 1993 until 1998, and again from 2008 until 2022. He has also been a member of the X Riigikogu and the XI Riigikogu.

Achievements
 Order of the White Star, Fourth Class

References

1955 births
Living people
Estonian Coalition Party politicians
Estonian Reform Party politicians
Estonian veterinarians
Members of the Riigikogu, 2003–2007
Members of the Riigikogu, 2007–2011
Estonian University of Life Sciences alumni
Academic staff of the Estonian University of Life Sciences
Rectors of universities in Estonia
Recipients of the Order of the White Star, 4th Class
People from Tartu
Politicians from Tartu